The 2017–18 UT Martin Skyhawks women's basketball team represent University of Tennessee at Martin during the 2017–18 NCAA Division I women's basketball season. The Skyhawks, led by ninth year head coach Kevin McMillan, play their home games at Skyhawk Arena as members of the Ohio Valley Conference. (OVC)

Schedule and results

|-
!colspan=9 style=| Exhibition

|-
!colspan=9 style=| Non–conference regular season

|-
!colspan=9 style=| Ohio Valley Conference regular season

|-
!colspan=9 style=| Ohio Valley Conference tournament

|-
!colspan=9 style=| Women's National Invitation Tournament

References

UT Martin Skyhawks women's basketball seasons
Tennessee-Martin
Tennessee-Martin